Mere Jeevan Saathi (English: My life partner) is a 2006 Indian Hindi-language romantic drama film starring Akshay Kumar, Karishma Kapoor and Amisha Patel. It was filmed back in 2001 and was supposed to release in 2003, but due to delays it was pushed back and was finally released in February 2006.

Synopsis 

Vicky is an aspiring singer who is devoted to his true love, Anjali. He gets a big offer from a music company in America and accepts it. In America, he meets the owner of the company, Natasha. Natasha helps Vicky become a star, however, Vicky is unaware of Natasha's hidden motives. Natasha knew Vicky in college and harboured a deep infatuation for him. Natasha's father had warned her that her love for Vicky can never be, as Vicky loved Anjali, but she refused to listen. When Natasha's father died in a car accident, Natasha, with no one else to love, put all her love and devotion on Vicky aside, and has been alone ever since.

Natasha invites Vicky to her home for her birthday. Things heat up and Vicky and Natasha spend a passionate night together. Vicky is horrified by what he has done. He goes back to India, but Natasha accompanies him. An uncomfortable Vicky tells Natasha that their one night together was a mistake and that he only loves Anjali. Natasha then attempts suicide but Vicky rushes her to the hospital in time. Vicky proposes to Anjali and she accepts. Natasha discovers that Vicky and Anjali are engaged. At the engagement party, Natasha, mad with jealousy, starts dancing barefoot on broken glass until she faints. Vicky later tells her to stay away from him. Natasha hires hitmen to plant a bomb in Vicky's car. Vicky realizes that Natasha's obsession with him has become dangerous. Overwhelmed with guilt, he confesses the truth to Anjali. Although hurt, she is not angry at him as he has punished himself enough. Anjali then insists on meeting with Natasha.

The two women meet and Anjali gently explains that Vicky has always loved her and never Natasha. Natasha threatens Anjali, saying that she will go to any length for Vicky – even kill. Anjali admits that while she cannot kill others, she would kill herself for him. When Anjali returns to Vicky, Natasha calls the couple to her home. The two arrive and see Natasha sitting in a chair. As they are apologizing for hurting her, they suddenly notice a gun in Natasha's hand and blood on her head. She had killed herself before the two arrived. Vicky finds a note that she had written, saying that by sacrificing her life, she proved that she will always love him. The film ends with Natasha's funeral and Anjali in Vicky's arms.

Cast 
 Akshay Kumar as Vicky	Bahl
 Karishma Kapoor as Natasha Arora
 Amisha Patel as Anjali Saluja	
 Gulshan Grover as Morani	
 Ashish Vidyarthi as Torani
 Alok Nath as Mr. Bahl, Vicky's dad 
 Maya Alagh as Mrs. Bahl, Vicky's mom
 Rakesh Bedi as Mac
 Razak Khan as Tarzan

Soundtrack 

The music of the film was composed Nadeem-Shravan and the lyrics were penned by Sameer Popularly known as Sameer Anjaan. The soundtrack was released in 2006 on Audio Cassette, LP record and Audio CDs by Shreekrishna Audio, and consists of seven tracks. The full album is recorded by Sadhna Sargam, Alisha Chinai, Kumar Sanu, Udit Narayan, Abhijeet Bhattacharya, Sonu Nigam, Alka Yagnik, Jaspinder Narula and Shaan.

References

External links
 

2006 films
2000s Hindi-language films
Films scored by Nadeem–Shravan
Films directed by Suneel Darshan